Acetyllysine (or acetylated lysine) is an acetyl-derivative of the amino acid lysine. There are multiple forms of acetyllysine - this article refers to N-ε-acetyl-L-lysine. The other form is N-α-acetyl-L-lysine.

In proteins, the acetylation of lysine residues is an important mechanism of epigenetics.  It functions by regulating the binding of histones to DNA in nucleosomes and thereby controlling the expression of genes on that DNA.  Non-histone proteins are acetylated as well.  Unlike the functionally similar methyllysine, acetyllysine does not carry a positive charge on its side chain.

Histone acetyltransferases (HATs) catalyze the addition of acetyl groups from acetyl-CoA onto certain lysine residues of histones and non-histone proteins.  Histone deacetylases (HDACs) catalyze the removal of acetyl groups from acetylated lysines.

Acetyllysine can be synthesized from lysine by the selective acetylation of the terminal amine group.

References

Amino acids
Acetamides